The Kindness of Strangers is the third studio album by American progressive rock band Spock's Beard released on May 19, 1998.

This was the first full album to be mixed by Rich Mouser, who became the primary mixing engineer for Spock's Beard and later all of Morse's projects. The album has since been remastered and re-released by Radiant Records with 5 bonus tracks consisting of radio edits and demos.

Track listing
All songs written by Neal Morse except where noted.

Personnel
Neal Morse – lead vocals, piano, all synths, acoustic and an occasional electric guitar
Alan Morse – main electric guitar, cello, Mellotron, vocals
Dave Meros – bass guitar, vocals
Nick D'Virgilio – drums, percussion, vocals
Ryo Okumoto – Hammond organ, Mellotron

Technical personnel
 Rich Mouser - mixing

References

Spock's Beard albums
1998 albums
Inside Out Music albums